The 23rd European Women's Artistic Gymnastics Championships were held from 12-14 May 2000 in Paris, France.

Medalists

Medal table

Combined

Seniors

Juniors

Seniors

Team 
The team competition also served as qualification for the individual all-around and event finals. The top 8 placing teams are listed below.

All-around

Vault

Uneven bars

Balance beam

Floor exercise

Juniors

Team

All-around

Vault

Uneven bars

Balance beam

Floor exercise

References 

2000
European Artistic Gymnastics Championships
European Artistic Gymnastics Championships
International sports competitions hosted by Paris
International gymnastics competitions hosted by France
European Artistic Gymnastics Championships
European Artistic Gymnastics Championships
European Artistic Gymnastics Championships